Lon Megargee (1883–1960) was an American painter from Arizona. He did paintings of the Arizona landscape, Native Americans, and cowboys. His artwork is displayed at the Arizona State Capitol.

Early life
Megargee was born in 1883 in Philadelphia, Pennsylvania. He lost his father at 13, and he spent his adolescence with his uncle, rancher Cornelius Borden, in Arizona. One of his cousins, Edwin Megargee, was a painter.

Megargee studied painting at the Pennsylvania Academy of the Fine Arts and the Los Angeles School of Art and Design.

Career
Megargee first worked on his uncle's ranch as a teenager, and later as a cowboy in Wickenburg, Arizona. He moved to Phoenix, where he was a firefighter and a police officer.

Megargee did paintings of the Arizona landscape, Native Americans, and cowboys. He did 15 paintings for the newly built Arizona State Capitol in 1913-1914, and three more in 1934. He designed advertisements for the A-1 Brewing Company in 1948-1951. He exhibited his paintings at the Grand Central Art Galleries in New York City in 1956.

Megargee was called "Arizona’s first cowboy artist" by True West Magazine.

Personal life and death
Megargee was "married at least seven times." He resided near Sedona, Arizona with his last wife, Hermine. Megargee had a son, Larry, who lived in California.

Megargee died in 1960 in Cottonwood, Arizona, at age 77.

Further reading

References

1960 deaths
People from Philadelphia
Pennsylvania Academy of the Fine Arts alumni
Painters from Phoenix, Arizona
20th-century American painters
American male painters
Artists of the American West
1883 births
20th-century American male artists